Bonecrusher may refer to:

 Bone crusher, a machine used to crush animal bones
 Bonecrusher (horse), a New Zealand racehorse
 Bonecrusher (Transformers), a fictional robot supervillain character in the Transformers robot superhero franchise.
 Bone Crusher (rapper) (born 1971), American rapper
 James Smith (boxer) (born 1953), American boxer nicknamed Bonecrusher
 "Bonecrusher", a song by American rock band Soulhat

See also
 Bonebreaker, a Marvel Comics super villain
 Bone Cruncher, a 1987 video game